The China–Singapore Suzhou Industrial Park, or Suzhou Industrial Park for short, abbreviated as SIP, is a county-level administrative area located in Suzhou, Jiangsu, China. The industrial park was established in February 1994, as part of the reform and opening up campaign in the 1990s, and is unique in its joint governance by Chinese and Singaporean officials. While the park struggled at first, and attracted international notoriety following a very publicized falling out between the two sides, it quickly began making a profit due to highly desirable real estate and the presence of many large global corporations, and remains an economic engine for the city.

History
In 1992, the idea of developing a modern industrial area with Singaporean experience was broached. During his tour of southern China that year, China's late paramount leader Deng Xiaoping said: "Singapore enjoys good social order and is well managed. We should tap on their experience, and learn how to manage better than them".

After rounds of discussions and site surveys, both governments decided to join hands in developing a modern industrial park in the east of Suzhou. Suzhou was chosen as the site due to its proximity to the financial hub of Shanghai, as well as its educated and skilled labor pool. The China–Singapore Suzhou Industrial Park (CS-SIP) was thus born on February 26, 1994, when Chinese Vice Premier Li Lanqing and Singaporean Senior Minister Lee Kuan Yew signed the Agreement on the Joint Development of Suzhou Industrial Park in Suzhou.

Upon its inception, the Singaporean government held a 65% stake in the Suzhou Industrial Park, while the Chinese government held a 35% stake.

Initial troubles 
The Suzhou Industrial Park (SIP) charged high rents in its early days, in part to pay off the expensive new facilities it built for investors. This created a contradiction, according to one writer of the now-defunct Far Eastern Economic Review, who suggested that "investors were looking to Suzhou for costs lower than Shanghai's, and the SIP was charging Shanghai-style prices".

The park ran into trouble when local officials began building Suzhou New District (SND) industrial park, which many news outlets have seen as a direct competition to the SIP. As the Suzhou city government had only a minority 35 percent stake in the SIP, while they had a major stake in SND, the city government largely ignored SIP and concentrated on promoting the SND instead.

Singaporean officials publicly complained in 1997 that Suzhou's city government was promoting the Suzhou New District more than the Suzhou Industrial Park, noting that more billboards in the city advertised the SND than the SIP. Singaporean officials tried to get the Suzhou government to suspend advertising for the SND for five years, but Suzhou city officials refused. As part of their complaint, Lee Kuan Yew threatened that Singapore may "bow out" of the project. The Singaporean government would later reduce its stake to just 35% in 1999, in an effort to incentivize the local government to support the SIP. As part of their partial pullout, Singapore recalled all but three of its civil servants involved in the project, and sold power and water treatment plants to their Chinese partners. By 1999, the New York Times reported that the project "is heavily in debt", and had been losing an average of 23.5 million United States dollars annually, according to Singaporean partners. Singaporean investors had poured 147 million into the project by 1999. Singaporean officials reported that the cumulative projected losses from the project would total 90 million dollars by the end of 2000. However, the Chinese side of the project reported that it was indeed profitable, claiming that it was projected to make a 72 million dollar profit in 1999.

The New York Times also suggested that "the project was supposed to transfer Singapore's management skills to Chinese bureaucrats and to teach China how to build and run "business-friendly" commercial parks. But it ended up straining the close relations between Singapore and China and bringing home to Singaporeans the often unpredictable, and sometimes underhand, business culture of the Communist mainland".

Singapore's senior minister, Lee Kuan Yew conceded that the project had not turned out as planned and had made him more cautious about investments in China, claiming that difficulties arose in signing agreements with the central government, but were then implemented by local officials who "have their own imperatives". Lee said that Chinese officials were "using us to get investors in, and when investors came in, they said: 'You come to my park, it's cheaper'".

Early turnaround 
In response to Singapore's public complaints and partial pullout, the industrial park received new management, with Wang Jinhua, the former manager of the Suzhou New District, and former vice-mayor of Suzhou, leading the park. Under Wang, the industrial park lowered rents, which has been credited by the Far Eastern Economic Review with attracting more investors, and helping the Suzhou Industrial Park compete with other regional industrial parks. In the first ten months of 2001, two years after Singapore lowered its stake, the park made its first profit of $3.8 million. Since assuming a majority stake in the project, Suzhou's city government begun subsidizing the joint-venture development company for shortfalls it suffers if land does not sell, and is offering other financial support, including paying up to three years' rent for some projects. That year, Singapore's top official remaining in the project, Goh Toh Sim, called the previous public disagreement "water under the bridge", and estimated that the SIP would make a profit of $7.5 million by the end of 2001, and be listed on the stock market by 2004.

However, much of the industrial park's early success was derived from its highly desirable real estate. In projecting the project's first profit in 2001, Goh also admitted that most of this profit would come from the sale of residential land, as opposed to industrial land. The scenic lakes in the park, the presence of an international school, and pension schemes by companies in the park which helped with apartment purchases all helped make the residential land in the park highly desirable. From 1998 to 2001, apartment prices in the industrial park rose by more than 50%.

While the industrial side of the project struggled to turn a profit, a number of major companies, such as Nokia, Alcatel and Philips, set up shop in the park, attracted by its large labor pool of workers who had experience in other electronics companies nearby. Semiconductor producers, including Samsung, and Hitachi, also organized production in the park, and the government began implementing further incentives to develop the area's semiconductor industry. One manager interviewed in an article for the Far Eastern Economic Review also noted that, since assuming a majority stake in the project, local authorities began improving their governance of the project, and provided political support for companies involved in the park.

Despite this early turnaround, one reporter in 2001 reported that "the park feels like an island of calm surrounded by bustle and vibrancy", noting large swathes of undeveloped land in the area. Simultaneously, the success of the park's real estate resulted in some manufacturers opting for less expensive regions, and some businessmen overseeing projects in the zone fear that increasing real estate costs would make the industrial park less competitive.

Later successes 
Despite attracting significant media attention early on for its high-profile setbacks, the project has since been viewed as a success by many. The Straits Times noted in a 2014 article that despite only comprising 3.4% of Suzhou's land area and 5.2% of its population, it contributed 15% of the city's economy. By 2014, some 25,000 companies were doing business in the industrial park, include 91 Fortune 500 companies. As of 2019, the industrial park has contributed about 119.11 billion dollars in tax revenue since its inception, and has achieved more than $1 trillion in foreign trade volume.

Real estate values in the Suzhou Industrial Park continued to rise greatly after its early years. In the first half of 2019 alone, the price of real estate rose 8.6% to 5,270 dollars per square meter. While real estate prices throughout Suzhou surged during this period, the South China Morning Post noted that real estate in the industrial park proved to be especially desirable thanks to the high-quality school systems and jobs in the area, resulting in the park having the most expensive residential properties in the entire city.

In August 2013, China News Service cited the Lianhe Zaobao as reporting that the governments of North Korea and South Korea have modelled the Kaesong Industrial Region upon the Suzhou Industrial Park. in August 2018, Xinhua reported that the China-Belarus Industrial Park was developed using the Suzhou Industrial Park as a model.

Geography 

Jinji Lake is a small fresh water lake located in the central part of Suzhou Industrial Park. There are two man-made islands in the lake. Yangcheng Lake is also located in the northern part of the industrial park.

The Luo River and Suzhou Creek both flow through the industrial park from west to east.

Governance 
A group known as the China-Singapore Joint Steering Council, comprising both Chinese and Singaporean officials and government bureaus, is tasked with the development of the industrial park. As of 2019, Han Zheng, the Vice Premier of China, serves as the head of the Chinese half of the Joint Steering Council, and Heng Swee Keat, the Deputy Prime Minister of Singapore, serves as the head of the Singaporean half.

Administrative divisions 
The Suzhou Industrial Park administers four subdistricts and four residential communities.

The park's four residential communities are Huxi Community, Hudong Community, Yueliangwan Community, and Dongshahu Community.

Economy 
As of 2013, the Suzhou Industrial Park is the second most productive industrial park in China, with a gross domestic product of 190 billion renminbi.

The Suzhou Industrial Park aims to attract high-tech industries, especially software-focused information technology and biotechnology industries. Major companies with operations in the industrial park include Samsung and UPS.

Reports surfaced in 2019 that the park was being affected by the US-China trade war, with exports having declined 10 per cent over the first seven months of 2019 when compared to 2018 figures, while imports have fallen 15 per cent over the same period.

Education 
Since its early days, Suzhou Industrial Park has attracted many residents due to its exceptional school system, and the industrial park has the most schools of all of Suzhou's county-level divisions. As of March 2021, the district has 81 kindergartens, 15 primary schools, 3 junior high schools, 18 nine-year schools, 3 regular secondary schools, 1 combined junior and senior secondary school, 2 fifteen-year schools, 2 special education schools, 2 schools for children of foreigners, 1 open university for elderly people, 1 youth activity center, and 1 city-wide secondary school.

Universities and higher education 

Suzhou Dushu Lake Higher Education Town, one of the government's key projects, is located in the industrial park. Its goal is to offer good education, advanced technology, and a pleasant living environment. The area is home to many universities (undergraduate as well as graduate schools) including local Chinese universities and universities from other countries. This community focuses on producing educated and creative people. The area offers facilities including libraries, entertainment venues, parks, a sports centre and accommodation. Wenxing Plaza and Hanlin Plaza are popular locations of many small restaurants and shops. Dushu Lake Library is an experimental library of the National Digital Library located in the industrial park. Major universities in the park include Suzhou University, Xi'an Jiaotong-Liverpool University and Renmin University of China, Suzhou Campus.

International schools 
The Suzhou Singapore International School is located in the Suzhou Industrial Park.

Other schools 
Suzhou Industrial Park No. 5 Middle School

Transportation 
The G2 Beijing-Shanghai Expressway runs through the Suzhou Industrial Park along a west–east axis. The eastern portion of Suzhou's Intermediate Ring Road also passes through the industrial park.

Two high-speed railways serve the industrial park: the Beijing-Shanghai high-speed railway and the Shanghai-Nanjing high-speed railway.

See also
Dushu Lake
Gate to the East
Jinji Lake
Sino-Singapore Tianjin Eco-city
Suzhou Ferris Wheel
Suzhou Industrial Park railway station
Suzhou New District
Yangcheng Lake

References

External links
 Suzhou Industrial Park Webpage

 
China–Singapore relations
Foreign trade of Singapore
Industrial parks in China
Special Economic Zones of China